Ivan Milas (born October 15, 1992, in Metković) is a Bosnian-Herzegovinian handball player who currently plays the polish club Gwardia Opole on loan from polish club Wisla Plock. He is also member of the Bosnia and Herzegovina national football team.  Milas is a left back. He previously played for Izviđač and Borac Banja Luka.

References

1992 births
Living people
Croats of Bosnia and Herzegovina
Bosnia and Herzegovina male handball players